Moslemen T. Macarambon Sr. is a Filipino public servant who is a commissioner of the Philippine Commission on Elections. Before he join COMELEC, he was regional trial court judge in Iligan City. He also served as the president of National Transmission Corporation (TransCo) from 2009 to 2010.

Members of the Brawner Commission
Assumed office: Nov. 5, 2007

See also
Commission on Elections (Philippines)

References

Living people
21st-century Filipino judges
1941 births
Filipino Muslims